The 2018–19 season was Hellas Verona Football Club's first season back in Serie B after being relegated to the second division at the end of the 2017–18 Serie A season. The club finished 5th in the 2018–19 Serie B season and were promoted back to the Serie A via winning the play-offs.

Season summary
On 21 June 2018, Fabio Grosso was appointed manager of Hellas, signing a two-year deal at the newly relegated Serie B club. Grosso was sacked on 1 May 2019 after a shock 3–2 home loss to relegation-threatened Livorno. He was replaced the next day by Alfredo Aglietti, with the goal to help the club getting into the promotion playoffs. Under Aglietti's short tenure, he managed to guide the club to fifth place in the regular season, and then to the promotion playoff finals, where Verona defeated Cittadella to achieve promotion to Serie A after only a single season in the second division. Despite his successes, however, Aglietti was not confirmed for another season, and Ivan Jurić was named as his replacement in charge of the club a few days later.

Squad

First team squad

On loan

Competitions

Serie B

League table

Play-offs

Preliminary round

Semi-final

Final

Coppa Italia

Second round

Third round

References

Hellas Verona F.C. seasons
Hellas Verona